Credited with helping to revive New York's acid house music scene, the Innovaders stepped away from current trends in IDM and created a new sound that puts emphasis on gritty acid, melodies, and song structure. While many artists were trying to dissect and copy the latest Autechre or Schematic Records sound, the duo looked to electronic dance music pioneers such as Derrick May and Adonis for inspiration. Using live performances as a testing ground, the Innovaders pounded out a new style of acid in the backrooms of many underground dance clubs.

Releases

Innovaders: EP 
Their first major hit was "Feetlegshead," which features a young ballet student explaining the importance of every movement while dancing. This track was used in The March 2003 issue of Metropolis Magazine's online article about the Guggenheim Museum. 
Metropolis Magazine Article: Scores for Stores

Make Some Acid 
Their second ep,  maintained a similar style but with a harder, grittier acid edge. All tracks on this ep are variations of the title track:

1. Make Some Acid

2. Take Some Acid

3. Break Some Acid

4. Fake Some Acid

Limited to only 200 copies, this release is extremely hard to find. The last track, "Fake Some Acid," alludes to the production style of the duo. Commonly, acid house is created using a Roland TB-303 bass synthesizer but the Innovaders are known to program software and process a raw square waveform to create their signature sound, thus "faking" acid.

Acid Reign 

Their latest release on Metal Postcard Records, A collection of chicago trax records influenced acid workouts and pop melodies. Dance floor standouts include "You'll Never Get Out of This Club Alive" and "We Get Open." Not included on this release is their much sought-after cover of Morrissey's "Everyday Is Like Sunday." It is rumored that this track will be available sometime in the future but is almost always in their live sets.

Live performances 
Known for their dynamic live sets, the Innovaders deliver a room shaking assault on all frequencies. From beginning to end their performances are littered with bursts of acid bass and a rush of beats. Unlike many artists in the IDM genre, the Innovaders will not give you the chance to gaze at your shoes while they noodle away on their gear. Always a crowd pleaser, the Innovaders have performed at many of New York's hottest clubs.

Discography
Innovaders: EP (2001)
Make Some Acid (2003)
Acid Reign (2006)

External links
Metal Postcard Records
SluntRec on the Web
Label and artist managed profile

Electronic music groups from New York (state)
Intelligent dance musicians
American techno music groups
American house music groups
American ambient music groups